Franziska may refer to:

People 
 Franziska (given name)
 Patrick Franziska (born 1992), German table tennis player

Characters 
 Franziska von Karma, character in the Ace Attorney series

Other uses 
 Franziska (play), a 1912 play by the German dramatist Frank Wedekind
 Franziska Tesaurus, a Gepid royal tomb found in Romania
 520 Franziska, an Eoan asteroid from the outer regions of the asteroid belt
 Franziska, an Italian ska band

See also 
 Francis (given name)
 Fränzi
 Franziska Linkerhand, a 1974 novel by Brigitte Reimann
 MS Franziska, a German television series